Bogdan Milošević (born 17 February 1989) is a Serbian footballer, who plays as a defender for FK Mladost Lučani.

Club career
Born in Titovo Užice, SFR Yugoslavia, Milošević started his career with Mladost Lučani. He made his senior debut for the club in the Serbian Superliga away match against Hajduk Kula, played on 10 November 2007. After one season with the club in the Serbian First League, Milošević spent two seasons as a loaned player with the Serbian League west clubs Sloga Požega and Sloga Bajina Bašta. Returning in Mladost, Milošević made 31 appearances in all competitions, being a scorer twice time for the 2011–12 season. In summer 2012, Milošević moved to Napredak Kruševac, helping the team to win the Serbian First League for the 2012–13 season and make promotion to the top tier in the Serbian football. In January 2014 Milošević moved on a six-month loan deal to the French side Tours, after which he signed with the club permanently. At the beginning of 2017, Milošević returned to Mladost Lučani. In June 2018, Milošević moved back to France, where he joined Laval.

Ahead of the 2019/20 season, Milošević joined FK Mladost Lučani.

Career statistics

Club

Honours
Napredak
Serbian First League: 2012–13

References

External links
 Bogdan Milošević stats at utakmica.rs 
 
 
 
 

1989 births
Living people
Sportspeople from Užice
Serbian footballers
Serbian expatriate footballers
Serbian expatriate sportspeople in France
Tours FC players
Ligue 2 players
Expatriate footballers in France
Association football defenders
FK Mladost Lučani players
FK Napredak Kruševac players
Serbian First League players
Serbian SuperLiga players
Stade Lavallois players